Lavié-Agoviépé is an area located in Togo. It contains Lavié and Agoviépé.

It is notable as it is the home of the Kotoko F.C., who play at the Stade Municipal in Lavié.

Populated places in Plateaux Region, Togo